Murder, She Wrote is an American crime drama television series, created by Peter S. Fischer, Richard Levinson and William Link, starring Angela Lansbury, and produced and distributed by Universal Television for the CBS network. The series focuses on the life of Jessica Fletcher, a mystery writer and amateur detective, who becomes involved in solving murders that take place in the fictional town of Cabot Cove, Maine, across the United States, and abroad. The program ran for 12 seasons from September 30, 1984, to May 19, 1996, for a total of 264 episodes and included amongst its recurring cast Tom Bosley, William Windom and Ron Masak, as well as a vast array of guest cast members including Michael Horton, Keith Michell and Julie Adams.

The series proved a ratings hit during its broadcast, becoming a staple of CBS Sunday night TV schedule for around a decade, while achieving distinction as one of the most successful and longest-running television shows in history, averaging 25 million viewers per week in its prime. In syndication, the series is still highly successful and popular throughout the world. For her role on the program, Lansbury was nominated for ten Golden Globes, winning four, along with nominations for 12 Emmy Awards, earning her the record for the most Golden Globe nominations and wins for Best Actress in a television drama series and the most Emmy nominations for Outstanding Lead Actress in a Drama Series. The series itself also received three Emmy nominations for Outstanding Drama Series, and six Golden Globe nominations in the same category, with two major wins.

After the series finished in 1996, four television films were released from 1997 to 2003. Two point-and-click video games were released for PC: one in 2009, and a sequel in 2012. A spin-off book series continues publication as of 2023.

History

Origin

Series producers Peter S. Fischer, Richard Levinson and William Link developed the lead role for actress Jean Stapleton, who was initially somewhat interested but eventually turned it down, threatening the project.

Scrambling to find another major star, the producers thought Angela Lansbury would be perfect for the part of Jessica Fletcher but did not think that she would be interested in a television series. Earlier, she had acted in two film adaptations of Agatha Christie's mystery novels: as Salome Otterbourne in Death on the Nile (1978) and as Miss Marple in The Mirror Crack'd (1980). When the latter film did poorly—despite an all-star cast including Rock Hudson, Elizabeth Taylor, Kim Novak, and Tony Curtis—the offer for Lansbury to reprise Miss Marple in three more films never materialized.

When she made it known she would be available if the right project came along, the three creators sent her the script and almost immediately, Lansbury felt she could do something with the role of Jessica Fletcher. With Murder, She Wrote debuting on Sunday, September 30, 1984, the producers were able to parlay their "mystery writer/amateur detective" premise into a 12-year hit for CBS. It also made Lansbury, known previously for her motion picture and Broadway stage work, a household name for millions of television viewers. The title comes from Murder, She Said, which was the title of a 1961 film adaptation of Agatha Christie's Miss Marple novel 4:50 from Paddington.

Premise 
The show revolves around the day-to-day life of Jessica Fletcher (née MacGill), a widowed and retired English teacher, who becomes a successful mystery writer. 
Despite fame and fortune, Jessica remains a resident of Cabot Cove, a small coastal community in Maine, and maintains her links with all of her old friends, never letting her success go to her head.

The show usually starts with a preview of the episode's events, with Jessica stating: "Tonight on Murder, She Wrote..." Jessica invariably proves more perceptive than the official investigators of a case, who are almost always willing to arrest the most likely suspect. By carefully piecing the clues together and asking astute questions, she leads the authorities to arrest the real murderer. Murder occurred with such regularity in her vicinity that the term "Cabot Cove syndrome" was coined to describe the constant appearance of dead bodies in remote locations. Indeed, if Cabot Cove existed in real life, it would top the FBI's national crime statistics in numerous categories, with some analysis suggesting that the homicide rate in Cabot Cove exceeds even that of the real-life murder capital of the world.

Jessica's relationship with law enforcement officials varies from place to place. Both sheriffs of Cabot Cove resign themselves to having her meddle in their cases. However, most detectives and police officers do not want her anywhere near their crime scenes, until her accurate deductions convince them to listen to her. Some are happy to have her assistance from the start, often because they are fans of her books. With time, she makes friends in many police departments across the U.S., as well as with a British police officer attached to Scotland Yard. At the start of season eight, more of the stories were set in New York City with Jessica moving into an apartment there part-time in order to teach criminology.

Production
Murder, She Wrote was mostly filmed on sound stages at Universal Studios in Universal City, California (near Los Angeles). The series also filmed exterior shots and some episodes on location in the Northern California town of Mendocino, which stood in for the fictional Maine town of Cabot Cove.

Lansbury considers retirement in 1988

In August 1988, Lansbury expressed weariness of her commitment to the series as she was not sure, at 63, that she could continue at the pace now required of her; she specifically cited the change from seven to eight days to shoot each episode. Thus, Murder, She Wrote went into its fifth season that autumn with the distinct possibility that it would cease production at the end of it and the series finale would air in May 1989.

A solution was worked on, however, which enabled Lansbury to continue but also give her time to rest. This also enabled some secondary characters to get significant stories. For the next two seasons, Lansbury reduced her appearances in several episodes, only appearing at the beginning and the end, to introduce stories starring several friends of Jessica, such as private investigator Harry McGraw, reformed thief Dennis Stanton or MI5 agent Michael Hagarty. The "experiment" ended in 1991. In 1992, Lansbury took on a more extensive role in production as she became the show's executive producer.

Move from Sundays in 1995
Murder, She Wrote was renewed for a twelfth season after finishing the 1994-95 season as the eighth-most watched program on television, tied with NBC’s new sitcom Friends for the spot. Despite the continued popularity of the program, Lansbury was considering retirement again after the upcoming season as she would be nearing seventy years of age at its conclusion. The decision, ultimately, would not be left up to her as CBS would make a decision regarding the series that would prove problematic for the network on two separate nights of programming. 

Murder, She Wrote was, at the time, CBS' most popular scripted series; in fact, it had been one of only two series on the network to garner a rating in the top ten (60 Minutes was the other). Meanwhile, over at NBC, their Thursday night Must See TV lineup had been a ratings powerhouse for years and CBS decided to use Murder, She Wrote in an effort to cut into their viewership. So, after eleven years on Sunday night, the series moved to Thursday for the 1995-96 season. It would keep the same 8 PM timeslot on its new night, leading off a lineup that included the new drama New York News and the long-running newsmagazine 48 Hours. 

The move was met with protests from fans, and the entire Thursday night lineup for CBS proved to be no match for NBC's lineup. Going up against Friends and a pair of freshman comedies in its time slot, Murder, She Wrote saw its ratings drop significantly on Thursday; in fact, the series dropped below a 10.0 rating when the final season ratings were tabulated. (Its follow-up, New York News, continued the downward trend and did even lower ratings, with CBS cancelling the new drama before December 1995.)

Meanwhile, CBS decided to go with a new Sunday lineup which consisted of the sophomore sitcom Cybill and the new comedy Almost Perfect replacing Murder, She Wrote in the 8 PM hour. The former fell nearly out of the top 50 in the ratings while the latter was moved to Mondays at midseason and replaced with The Bonnie Hunt Show in an unsuccessful effort to lift that show's ratings and prevent its cancellation. 

Ultimately, Murder, She Wrote finished in 58th place in the final ratings and CBS opted not to renew the series for a thirteenth season. The network did, however, eventually reverse itself on the scheduling. After CBS aired a new episode of Murder, She Wrote on February 25, 1996 that drew nearly 20 million viewers, the show went on a month long hiatus for CBS’ coverage of March Madness. Following two episodes that aired on Thursdays on March 28 and April 4, 1996, Murder, She Wrote was moved back to its original Sunday night airtime for the remaining episodes of the series. The show returned to Sunday on April 25, and the final episode aired on May 19. Three of these episodes drew over 16 million viewers and the finale finished in the top 20 programs for the week. 

The network also agreed to commission four Murder, She Wrote movies over the next few years.  The first was South by Southwest (1997), with three more following as A Story to Die For (2000), The Last Free Man (2001), and The Celtic Riddle (2003).

Lansbury stated in May 2011 that she would like to make a comeback appearance as Jessica Fletcher. However, in a 2015 interview, she quashed the idea of reprising the much beloved character, stating, "I think it would be a downer. In some way, we’d have to show her as a much older woman, and I think it’s better to maintain that picture we have in our mind’s eye of her as a vigorous person.  I’m still pretty vigorous, especially in the garden … but if I wanted to transform myself back into the woman I looked like then, it would be ridiculous. And I can't do that." Lansbury died on October 11, 2022, five days before her 97th birthday.

Cast

Regular cast

 Angela Lansbury as Jessica Fletcher (1984–1996; 264 episodes), a retired English teacher who, after being widowed in her early 50s, becomes a very successful mystery writer. The only cast member to appear in every episode as the series is centred around her.

Recurring cast 
William Windom as Dr. Seth Hazlitt (1985–1996; 52 episodes), the local doctor of Cabot Cove and one of Jessica's best friends and most intrepid supporters. Windom previously appeared as another character, a lawyer named Sam Breen, in the season 1 finale, "Funeral at Fifty-Mile." Windom also played a separate character in Magnum P.I., which takes place in the same universe.
 Ron Masak as Sheriff Mort Metzger (1988–1996; 39 episodes), a former NYPD officer who takes Sheriff Tupper's place as sheriff in the mistaken belief that he would be living in a more peaceful place. His unseen wife, Adele, a former Marine capable of prodigious acts of strength, teaches self-defense classes. Masak previously appeared as other characters in earlier episodes: a police officer in the season 1 episode "Footnote to Murder," and a store owner in trouble with the IRS in the season 3 episode "No Accounting for Murder."
 Louis Herthum as Deputy Andy Broom (1991–1996, 25 episodes), Sheriff Metzger's second deputy.
 Tom Bosley as Sheriff Amos Tupper (1984–1988; 19 episodes), Cabot Cove's sheriff at the start of the series. Tupper later retires and goes to live with his sister.
 Will Nye as Deputy Floyd (1988–1991, 15 episodes), Sheriff Metzger's original deputy.

 Michael Horton as Grady Fletcher (12 episodes, 1984–1990, 1995), Jessica's unlucky favorite nephew, who (through no fault of his own) always seems to get in trouble with the law. After some romantic disasters, he eventually marries his girlfriend Donna.
 Julie Adams as Eve Simpson (10 episodes, 1987–1993), the Cabot Cove realtor with a great love for men, both single and married, and for gossiping.
 Keith Michell as Dennis Stanton (9 episodes, 1988–1991, 1993), a suave English former jewel thief turned insurance claims investigator, who always solves his cases using unusual methods, and often sends a copy of the story to Jessica afterwards. Many of the episodes starring Dennis do not involve Jessica, and usually begin with her introducing the story to the audience, breaking the fourth wall. Keith Michell is the only actor other than Angela Lansbury to receive star billing (before the episode titles), on episodes which focus on Dennis.
 Len Cariou as Michael Hagarty (7 episodes, 1985–86, 1988–1992), a British former MI5 agent, who often appeared when Jessica least expected him to drag her into a dangerous case. Cariou had previously starred with Lansbury on Broadway in Sweeney Todd: The Demon Barber of Fleet Street as the titular character.
 Richard Paul as Sam Booth (7 episodes, 1986–89, 1991–1992), the genial, ineffectual mayor of Cabot Cove who is elected on his campaign promise to do nothing.
 Herb Edelman as Artie Gelber (7 episodes, 1992–1995), a NYPD Lieutenant and Jessica's friend. Edelman had previously appeared as various characters in the series pilot, the season 2 episode "Murder by Appointment Only," and the season 3 episode "Murder in a Minor Key."
 Jerry Orbach as Harry McGraw (7 episodes, 1985–1987, 1989, 1991), an old-school private investigator who becomes friends with Jessica. Orbach was popular enough to garner his own, short-lived spin-off series in 1987, The Law & Harry McGraw, and returned to Murder, She Wrote after his show was cancelled. Harry ceased to be a character permanently after Orbach took on the role of Lennie Briscoe on Law & Order in 1992.

Occasional cast
 Hallie Todd as Rhoda Markowitz (6 episodes, 1990–1991), Dennis Stanton's assistant. Todd had previously appeared as another character in the season 6 episode "Class Act."
 Ken Swofford as Lt. Perry Catalano (6 episodes, 1990–1991). Swofford also appeared in four previous episodes and one later episode as various characters.
 James Sloyan as Robert Butler (5 episodes, 1990–1991). Sloyan had previously appeared as different characters in the season 3 episode "Corned Beef and Carnage" and the season 4 episode "The Body Politic."
 Wayne Rogers as Charlie Garrett (5 episodes, 1993–1995), a disreputable private investigator who usually gets into trouble and needs Jessica's help. Charlie’s character was the replacement for Harry McGraw after Jerry Orbach’s departure. 
 Leonard Lightfoot as Detective Henderson (5 episodes, 1993–1994).
 Debbie Zipp as Donna Mayberry Fletcher (5 episodes, 1988–1990), Grady's girlfriend and later wife. Zipp had previously played another character in the season 3 episode "The Days Dwindle Down." Zipp and Horton are married in real life, and have been since prior to the show.
 Claude Akins as Ethan Cragg (4 episodes, 1984), Jessica's fisherman friend. Ethan is replaced by Seth as Jessica's friend from Season 2 onwards.
 Madlyn Rhue as Jean O'Neil (4 episodes, 1993–1996), Cabot Cove's disabled librarian. Rhue had previously appeared as another character in the season 6 episode "Seal of the Confessional."
 John Astin as Harry Pierce (3 episodes, 1984–1985), a local real estate agent. In his final appearance, Pierce briefly becomes Sheriff when Amos Tupper retires but turns out to be unsuitable for the job. Astin had previously appeared in the season 1 episode "Hooray for Homicide," and later appeared in the season 11 episode "Film Flam", portraying different characters.
 Genie Francis as Victoria Brandon Griffin (3 episodes, 1984, 1986, 1990), Jessica's niece. Other than Grady Fletcher, she is the only one of Jessica's many nieces and nephews to appear more than once. Victoria's husband, hapless actor Howard Griffin (Jeff Conaway), also featured in an episode.
 Ruth Roman as Loretta Speigel (3 episodes, 1987–1989), Cabot Cove's lovelorn hairdresser and an inveterate gossip.
 Kathryn Grayson as Ideal Molloy (3 episodes, 1987–1989), one of the regulars at Loretta's beauty parlour.
 Gloria DeHaven as Phyllis Grant (3 episodes, 1987–1989), one of the regulars at Loretta's beauty parlour.
 Bruce Gray as Ted Hartley (3 episodes, 1991–1994). Gray had previously appeared as different characters in two other episodes.
 Gregory Sierra as Lt. Gabriel Caceras (3 episodes, 1993–1995). Sierra had previously appeared as various characters in three other episodes.
 Paddi Edwards as Lois Hoey (2 episodes, 1984), a resident of Cabot Cove and member of its PTA, and a friend of Jessica's. Appears in the Pilot and another episode of Season 1.

Many actors also appeared in many episodes playing various characters, sometimes a different character in each one. These include Rosanna Huffman, who portrayed a member of the PTA in the Pilot episode and various others across all the seasons, appearing in 7 episodes overall; Tricia O'Neil who appeared in the Pilot and 5 episodes overall; and Barbara Babcock, who portrayed different characters in 5 episodes. There are several other examples.

Episodes

Crossover with Magnum, P.I.

The third-season episode of Murder, She Wrote entitled "Magnum on Ice" concludes a crossover that began on the seventh-season Magnum, P.I. episode "Novel Connection". In the episode's plot, Jessica comes to Hawaii to investigate an attempt to murder Robin Masters' guests, and then tries to clear Magnum when he's accused of killing the hitman. The Magnum, P.I. episode originally aired on November 19, 1986, with the concluding Murder, She Wrote episode following four days later on November 23.

The Magnum, P.I. episode of the crossover is included on the Murder, She Wrote Season 3 DVD set, as well as the Complete Series Set. The Magnum, P.I. Season 7 DVD set, as well as its Complete Series set, includes the Murder, She Wrote episode.

Awards and nominations
Over its twelve-year run Murder, She Wrote received numerous award nominations. Lansbury herself holds the record for the most Emmy nominations for outstanding lead actress in a drama series with twelve, one for each season. She never won, which is also a record. Mary Dodson, the art director for 102 of the series' 264 episodes, received three Emmy nominations for her work on Murder, She Wrote. In total, the show was nominated for 41 Emmys.

US television ratings
Murder, She Wrote maintained extremely high ratings, finishing in the top 15 of shows for eleven of its 12 seasons (eight of which it was in the top 10), even well into its late seasons. By its 11th season, Murder, She Wrote was still averaging 25 million viewers per week. At its very peak, the show even hit above 40 million US viewers. However, at the beginning of its 12th season in 1995, CBS moved the show from its extremely popular Sunday night time slot to Thursday night forcing it to compete with NBC's Must See TV line up, and as a result the ratings plummeted, during Season 11 and 12 CBS lost affiliates during the television realignment, meaning major markets could not find the network. The show rated as the following:

Abandoned reboot
Deadline Hollywood reported in October 2013 that NBC was planning a reboot of the series, starring Oscar-winning actress Octavia Spencer as a "hospital administrator and amateur sleuth who self-publishes her first mystery novel."

Lansbury commented that she was not a fan of using the title, saying "I think it's a mistake to call it 'Murder, She Wrote,' because 'Murder, She Wrote' will always be about Cabot Cove and this wonderful little group of people who told those lovely stories and enjoyed a piece of that place, and also enjoyed Jessica Fletcher, who is a rare and very individual kind of person." Early on it was decided by producers that Spencer's character would not be named Jessica Fletcher, for only Lansbury could play Jessica Fletcher. It was announced on January 21, 2014, that the reboot would not be going forward.

Merchandise
In 1985, Warren Company released a Murder, She Wrote board game. In the game, one player takes the hidden role of a killer and the other players try to determine which player is the killer through deduction.  The killer wins for killing five of the characters on the game-board and escaping, while the detective players win by correctly deducing the identity of the killer.

In December 2009, casual game developer and publisher Legacy Interactive, under license with Universal Pictures Digital Platforms Group (UPDPG), announced the release a PC and Macintosh video game, Murder, She Wrote, based on the television series. In the game, players help Jessica Fletcher to solve five unusual murders. A sequel, Murder She Wrote 2, was launched by Legacy Interactive in November 2012.

In 2020, Funko released a Jessica Fletcher POP! vinyl collectible figure.

Multimedia
List of novels
Home video releases
Mystery Theatre

References

External links

 

 
1984 American television series debuts
1996 American television series endings
1980s American crime drama television series
1980s American mystery television series
1990s American crime drama television series
1990s American mystery television series
American detective television series
Anthony Award-winning works
Best Drama Series Golden Globe winners
CBS original programming
Edgar Award-winning works
English-language television shows
Television series by Universal Television
Television series created by Peter S. Fischer
Television series created by Richard Levinson
Television series created by William Link
Television shows about writers
Television shows filmed in California
Television shows set in Maine